Babacar Maurice Diop, also known as Bu Baca Diop or Bu Baca, is an Australian-based Senegal-born musician and is the front man of eponymous bands. His music is Afro jazz and world jazz. The album, Stand, was nominated for the 1995 ARIA Award for Best World Music Album.

Biography 

Babacar Maurice Diop, was born on Gorée Island, Senegal. He was a member of Dakar-based groups, Star Band de Dakar and then Number One de Dakar, before relocating to Paris and subsequently to Sydney.

In Australia Diop has fronted eponymous ensembles, Bu Baca Diop and Bu Baca, on lead vocals. His music is Afro jazz and world jazz.

Linc Dubwise of The Canberra Times observed that the album, Nagoo (June 1993), used, "a battery of Senegalese percussionists, young Australian jazz innovators and a thoroughly dynamic sound, even more excitement is promised during concert performances."
 
Bu Baca has a varying membership that has included Malik Diop, Abdoulaye Lefevre, Yamar Diop, Blindman's Holiday, Miles Kuma, Paul Burton, Carl Dimitarga, Adam Armstrong, Elhadj N'dong, Chris Sweeney, Michael Iveson, Alan Dargin, Cameron Hanly, Craig Walters, James Greening, Miroslav Bukovsky, Ababacar, Lypso Aboud, Victor Rounds, Keef West, Jason Gubay, Con Settinery, Scott O'Hara, Laye Diop, Hadg Diop, Ronnie, Melanie and Lie.

His album, Stand  was released in 1994. Opiyo Oloya of RootsWorld felt, "[his] rich Wolof voice soars against the deep response of the didgeridoo while funky horns cut bright swath across the intricate mbalanx drums." At the ARIA Music Awards of 1995, it was nominated for Best World Music Album.

Discography

Albums

Awards and nominations

ARIA Music Awards
The ARIA Music Awards is an annual awards ceremony that recognises excellence, innovation, and achievement across all genres of Australian music. They commenced in 1987.

! 
|-
| 1995
| Stand
| ARIA Award for Best World Music Album
| 
| 
|-

References

20th-century Senegalese male singers
20th-century Australian male singers
Australian drummers
Living people
Year of birth missing (living people)